= Corruption in the Netherlands =

Corruption in the Netherlands is minimal in all major areas—judiciary, police, business, politics—as the country is considered one of the least corrupt within the European Union.

== Extent ==
The National Integrity System Assessment 2012, published by Transparency International Netherlands, reports that the country has established strong pillars—an independent judiciary, effective anti-corruption mechanisms and a culture of trust—that all combine to create a society where corruption is not considered a serious problem. The government has dedicated large efforts towards keeping corruption within the country at low levels, yet limitations are perceived in some areas. The public sector is not perceived to be corrupt and transparency within the sector is safeguarded by codes of conduct for civil servants, with a special focus on integrity within their sectors, according to the National Integrity System Assessment 2012.

=== Business ===
The Netherlands is a global leader in the area of Corporate Social Responsibility (CSR), and most companies operating in the Netherlands have established a code of conduct as well as internal mechanisms to detect and prevent bribery.

According to Eurobarometer 2012, connections between business and politics are the most cited reason behind corruption and almost one-third of surveyed citizens share this perception. This is supported by the National Integrity System Assessment 2012, which notes that collusion between businesses and public authorities is especially prevalent in the public procurement sector. This sector is sensitive to irregularities and the report recommends the government strengthen regulations and supervision of public procurements.

=== Government ===
On Transparency International's 2025 Corruption Perceptions Index, the Netherlands scored 78 on a scale from 0 ("highly corrupt") to 100 ("very clean"). When ranked by score, the Netherlands ranked 8th among the 182 countries in the Index, where the country ranked first is perceived to have the most honest public sector. For comparison with regional scores, the best score among Western European and European Union countries (Note: Austria, Belgium, Bulgaria, Croatia, Cyprus, Czechia, Denmark, Estonia, Finland, France, Germany, Greece, Hungary, Iceland, Ireland, Italy, Latvia, Lithuania, Luxembourg, Malta, Netherlands, Norway, Poland, Portugal, Romania, Slovakia, Slovenia, Spain, Sweden, Switzerland, and the United Kingdom.) was 89, the average score was 64 and the worst score was 40. For comparison with worldwide scores, the best score was 89 (ranked 1), the average score was 42, and the worst score was 9 (ranked 181, in a two-way tie).
